The Japanese Federation of Construction Industry Workers (KENSETSU DOMEI) was a trade union representing workers in the building industry in Japan.

The union was founded in 1978 and became affiliated with the Japanese Confederation of Labour.  By 1985, it had 12,601 members.  At the end of the decade, it moved to the Japanese Trade Union Confederation.  In 1990, it merged with the Construction Ministry Workers' Unions, to form the Japan Construction Trade Union Confederation.

References

Building and construction trade unions
Trade unions established in 1978
Trade unions disestablished in 1990
Trade unions in Japan